Lepidium howei-insulae , commonly known as mustard & cress, is a flowering plant in the mustard and cabbage family. The specific epithet alludes to Lord Howe Island, where it is found.

Description
It is a perennial subshrub, sometimes with creeping stems, growing to about 1 m in height. The acute to subapiculate, fleshy, glabrous leaves are usually 2–6 cm long, 2–4 mm wide. The small white flowers have petals 1.5 mm long. The ellipsoidal seeds are 1.5 mm long.

Distribution and habitat
The plant is endemic to Australia’s subtropical Lord Howe Island group in the Tasman Sea. As well as having a scattered distribution on the main island, where it occupies rocky ledges and sandy pockets near the sea, it has been recorded from the nearby stack of Balls Pyramid.

References

howei-insulae
Endemic flora of Lord Howe Island
Plants described in 1906
Taxa named by Albert Thellung